Swatantra Nepali ('Free Nepali') was a Nepali language weekly newspaper published from Dehra Dun, India. The newspaper covered political issues of Nepal, and voiced opposition against Rana rule in the country. The first issue of Swatantra Nepali was published on August 21, 1954. The newspaper was published by Thakur Chandan Singh (that had run different magazines in the past, but left publishing in 1933). Thakur Pratap Singh, former Home and Development Minister of Bikaner State and a member of the Bikaner royal family, contributed to the finances of the newspaper.

The issues of Swatantra Nepali covered 8-12 pages each, and were sold at the price of one anna. It was printed at Yugabani Press.

The last issue of Swatantra Nepali was published on August 30, 1955. Publication was discontinued due to lack of funds. All in all, 46 issues of the newspaper had been printed.

References

Fake news network 
Weekly newspapers published in India
Nepali-language newspapers
1954 establishments in Uttar Pradesh
1955 disestablishments in India
Publications disestablished in 1955
Defunct newspapers published in India
Defunct weekly newspapers